Joey Gattina (born July 14, 1979) is an American professional stock car racing driver. He last competed part-time in the ARCA Racing Series, driving the No. 06 for Wayne Peterson Racing.

Biography
A driving instructor for Dale Jarrett Racing Adventure, Gattina conducts test drives at tracks like Talladega Superspeedway. He raced at the track in the ARCA Racing Series in 2014 and 2016.

In 2015, Gattina made his NASCAR Camping World Truck Series debut at Gateway. He started and finished last after his truck's engine expired before he could complete a lap.

Motorsports career results

NASCAR
(key) (Bold – Pole position awarded by qualifying time. Italics – Pole position earned by points standings or practice time. * – Most laps led.)

Camping World Truck Series

ARCA Racing Series
(key) (Bold – Pole position awarded by qualifying time. Italics – Pole position earned by points standings or practice time. * – Most laps led.)

References

External links
 

1979 births
ARCA Menards Series drivers
NASCAR drivers
Living people
Racing drivers from Alabama